Dwisuryo Indroyono Soesilo (born March 27, 1955 in Bandung, Indonesia) is a Coordinating Minister for the Ministry of Internal Affairs.

References 

1955 births
People from Bandung Regency
21st-century Indonesian politicians
Living people